Billie "Tiny" Moore (May 12, 1920 – December 15, 1987) was a Western swing musician who played the electric mandolin and fiddle with  Bob Wills and the Texas Playboys in the 1940s. He played with The Strangers and Merle Haggard during the 1970s and 1980s.

Career
Moore was born in the Gulf Coast town of Port Arthur, Texas, in 1920. His primary instrument was electric mandolin. While a member of the Texas Playboys from 1946 to 1950, he played Gibson electric mandolins: at first an EM-125, and sometime after 1948, an EM-150. Although these are 8-string mandolins, Moore used four single strings instead of pairs. This made his mandolin sound like an electric guitar. In 1952, he commissioned a five-string electric mandolin from Paul Bigsby. Moore was playing in a band led by Bob Wills' brother, Billy Jack. The Bigsby 5-string mandolin had single courses of strings (rather than the paired courses on a standard mandolin) and added a low C string to the standard G, D, A and E. This tuning actually gives the instrument a wider range of notes than a guitar.

Western swing is a hybrid of country, blues, and jazz; Moore's style of playing draws from all of these sources. Moore and his Bigsby mandolin were identified with each other for the remainder of his career.

In the mid-1960s he taught group guitar lessons at the local YMCA in Sacramento, California. He taught every style of music. He operated Tiny Moore Music, a music store in Sacramento, and sold copies of the Bigsby mandolin built by Jay Roberts of Yuba City. In the 1970s he made two albums with for Kaleidoscope Records: Tiny Moore Music and Back to Back, a duet album with Jethro Burns. In 1999, Moore was posthumously inducted into the Rock and Roll Hall of Fame in as a member of Bob Wills and His Texas Playboys.

References

1920 births
1987 deaths
People from Port Arthur, Texas
20th-century American musicians
Western swing performers
Country musicians from Texas
The Strangers (American band) members